10th BSFC Awards
1990

Best Film: 
 Crimes and Misdemeanors 
The 10th Boston Society of Film Critics Awards honored the best filmmaking of 1989. The awards were given in 1990.

Winners
Best Film:
Crimes and Misdemeanors
Best Actor:
Daniel Day-Lewis – My Left Foot
Best Actress:
Jessica Tandy – Driving Miss Daisy
Best Supporting Actor:
Danny Aiello – Do the Right Thing
Best Supporting Actress:
Brenda Fricker – My Left Foot
Best Director:
Woody Allen – Crimes and Misdemeanors
Best Screenplay:
Woody Allen – Crimes and Misdemeanors
Best Cinematography:
Michael Ballhaus – The Fabulous Baker Boys
Best Documentary:
Let's Get Lost
Best Foreign-Language Film:
Story of Women (Une affaire de femmes) • France

External links
Past Winners

References
1989 Boston Society of Film Critics Awards Internet Movie Database

1989
1989 film awards
1989 awards in the United States
1989 in Boston